Michael Harrison Rose (born 8 April 1942 in Hereford) is an English former cricketer active from 1963 to 1964 who played for Cambridge University(1962-1964), Leicestershire(1963-1964), and Marylebone Cricket Club (1964). He appeared in 31 first-class matches as a right-handed batsman who scored 808 runs with a highest score of 86.

Notes

1942 births
English cricketers
Leicestershire cricketers
Cambridge University cricketers
Marylebone Cricket Club cricketers
Living people